Arylakh (Arıılaax) is a rural locality (a selo), the only inhabited locality, and the administrative center of Arylakhsky Rural Okrug of Churapchinsky District in the Sakha Republic, Russia, located  from Churapcha, the administrative center of the district. Its population as of the 2010 Census was 348, down from 401 as recorded during the 2002 Census.

References

Notes

Sources
Official website of the Sakha Republic. Registry of the Administrative-Territorial Divisions of the Sakha Republic. Chruapchinsky District. 

Rural localities in Churapchinsky District